Antiquitates (Antiquities) may refer to the short title of the following works:

Antiquitates, three works by William Burton (antiquary, died 1645)
Antiquitates Americanæ (1837), Carl Christian Rafn
Antiquitates Asiaticae (1728), by Edmund Chishull 
Antiquitates Judaicae (AD 93/94), by Flavius Josephus 
Antiquitates Rutupinae, by John Battely (d. 1708)
Antiquitates rerum humanarum et divinarum (1st century BC), by Varro 
Antiquitates S. Edmundi Burgi, by John Battely (d. 1708)
Antiquitates Urbis (1527), by Andrea Fulvio 
Antiquities of the Church, by Joseph Bingham (d. 1723)
Chronica Sive Antiquitates Glastoniensis Ecclesie (c. 1340), by John of Glastonbury 
Popular Antiquities (1728), by Henry Bourne

See also
Antiquities, old valuable objects or artifacts
Antiquities (film), a 2018 American comedy film
Ancient (disambiguation)
Antique (disambiguation)
Antiquity (disambiguation)
Classical antiquity